The 1949 NAFC Championship was the second edition of the association football championship for the North American Football Confederation.

In 1949, the NAFC Championship served both as a regional championship as well as the regional qualification tournament for the 1950 FIFA World Cup and was held in Mexico City. Four teams were invited, Cuba, Mexico, Canada and the United States, but Canada did not send a team.

Mexico easily topped the standings, going undefeated and outscoring the two other teams seventeen goals to two. The United States came in second and Cuba, winless in its four games, was third. As the top two teams qualified for the World Cup, Mexico and the U.S. went to the finals in Brazil.

Venues

Standings

Matches 

Mexico: Raúl Córdoba, Felipe Zetter, Carlos Laviada (captain), José Antonio Roca, Mario Ochoa, Héctor Ortíz, Antonio Flores, Luis Luna, Horacio Casarín, Luis de la Fuente, Carlos Septién

United States: Frank Borghi, Ben Wattman, Manuel Martin, Walter Bahr, Charlie Colombo, Bill Sheppell, Frank Wallace, Jack Hynes, Pete Matevich, John Souza, Benny McLaughlin

Mexico: Raúl Córdoba, Jorge Romo, Carlos Laviada (captain), José Antonio Roca, Mario Ochoa, Héctor Ortíz, Antonio Flores, Luis Luna, Horacio Casarín, Luis de la Fuente, Carlos Septién

Cuba: Arozamena, Barquín, Llerandi, Ovide, J.Minsal, Torrent, Veiga, Fano, Gómez, Torres, Brios, Granado 

Cuba: Rolando Aguilar, Jacinto Barquin, Bernardo Llerandi, José Minsal, Marcelino Minsal, Francisco Torrent, Clerch, José Gómez, Ricardo Torres, Vicente Pérez, Manuel Briso, A. Granado 

United States: Frank Borghi, Harry Keough, Manuel Martin, Bill Sheppell, Charlie Colombo, Walter Bahr, Frank Wallace, Jack Hynes, Pete Matevich, John Souza, Benny McLaughlin

Mexico: Melesio Osnaya, Jorge Romo, Carlos Laviada (captain), Héctor Ortíz, Mario Ochoa, José Antonio Roca, Antonio Flores, Francisco Hernández, Horacio Casarín, Luis de la Fuente, Carlos Septién

United States: Frank Borghi, Harry Keough, Manuel Martin, Bill Sheppell, Charlie Colombo, Walter Bahr, Frank Wallace, Jack Hynes, Ben Wattman, John Souza, Benny McLaughlin

United States: Frank Borghi, Harry Keough, Manuel Martin, Bill Sheppell, Charlie Colombo, Walter Bahr, Frank Wallace, Jack Hynes, Pete Matevich, John Souza, Benny McLaughlin

Cuba: Pedro Arosemana (Rolando Aguilar 40'), Jacinto Barquin, Bernardo Llerandi, José Ovide, José Minsal, Francisco Torrent, Santiago Veiga, José Gómez, Ricardo Torres, Angel Valdes, Manuel Brioso, Armando Granado

Mexico: Melesio Osnaya, Felipe Zetter, Gregorio "Tepa" Gómez, Alfonso Montemayor (captain), Samuel Cuburu, Raúl Varela, Antonio Flores, José Naranjo, Mario "Flaco" Pérez, Luis Vázquez, Enrique Sesma

Cuba: Aguilar, Barquín, Llerandi, Ovide, J.Minsal, Torrent, Veiga, Pérez, Gómez, Torres, Valdés, Granado, Fano

Scorers 
Four goals
  Horacio Casarín
  Luis de la Fuente

Two goals
  Antonio Flores
  Luis Luna
  José Naranjo
  Pete Matevich
  John Souza
  Frank Wallace

One goal
  Jacinto Barquín
  José Gómez
  Santiago Veiga
  Mario Ochoa
  Héctor Ortíz
  Carlos Septién
  Walter Bahr
  Ben Wattman

External links 
 Tournament results

NAFC Championship
1949
1950 FIFA World Cup qualification
1949–50 in American soccer
1949–50 in Mexican football
1949 in Cuban sport
NAFC
NAFC